Picote is a civil parish in the municipality of Miranda do Douro, Portugal.

The population in 2011 was 301, in an area of 19.95 km².

Population

References

Freguesias of Miranda do Douro